Ulf Mark Schneider (born 9 September 1965) is a German-American businessman, and the CEO of Nestlé.  He is the former CEO of the healthcare group Fresenius SE.

Early life
Schneider was born and raised in Neuwied, Germany. He became a U.S. citizen in 2003. He holds a doctorate in economics from the University of St. Gallen, Switzerland, and an MBA from Harvard Business School.

Career
Schneider was group finance director for Gehe UK plc, a pharmaceutical wholesale and retail distributor, in Coventry, England. Schneider held several senior executive positions starting in 1989 with Gehe's majority shareholder, Franz Haniel & Cie. GmbH, a diversified German industrial company.

Schneider joined Fresenius in November 2001, when he was appointed chief financial officer of Fresenius Medical Care. From May 2003 until June 2016 he served as CEO of the parent company Fresenius. Under Schneider's leadership of Fresenius, the number of employees more than tripled, revenue quadrupled and net income increased twelvefold. While Schneider was CEO, Fresenius also carried out a number of major strategic acquisitions: the private hospital chain HELIOS Kliniken in 2005; US dialysis provider Renal Care Group, in 2006; US pharmaceutical company APP Pharmaceuticals, in 2008; Liberty Dialysis, another major dialysis provider in the US, in 2011; and, in 2014, the purchase of 41 hospitals from Rhön-Klinikum, through which HELIOS became the largest private hospital operator in Germany.

In June 2016, Schneider was appointed CEO of Nestlé S.A., replacing Paul Bulcke. He started as CEO in January 2017. Schneider is the first outsider to run Nestlé since 1922. In 2017, Schneider announced the intent to focus capital spending on higher-growth categories of coffee, pet food, baby food and water and added consumer health to the list of priorities. He  divested U.S. confections and ice cream businesses in a multibillion-dollar deals and led acquisitions of Atrium Health, Blue Bottle Coffee (majority stake), Sweet Earth Foods, Chameleon Cold-Brew, Tails.com, Freshly, and the Starbucks retail brand.

Schneider took the company out of stagnant product categories like bottled water and expanded into growing markets like supplements and plant proteins. Nestlé completed 85 acquisitions, while also selling many Nestlé businesses like the skincare division in order to focus on the food and beverage markets. Sales growth accelerated. According to Financial Times, Schneider also led "some of the sector’s more ambitious environmental targets," such as a $2 billion effort to improve the recyclability of Nestlé's product packaging.

Schneider chaired the European advisory board of Harvard Business School until 2016 and served on the board of directors of the American chemical company DuPont from 2014 to 2017.

In March 2022, Denys Shmyhal, the prime minister of Ukraine, criticized Schneider for not showing 'understanding' as the latter reportedly refused to suspend operations of Nestlé in Russia during the invasion of Ukraine. Shmyhal said that 'paying taxes to the budget of a terrorist country means killing defenseless children & mothers'. Nestle later suspended shipment of non-essential items but continued to produce essential food items in Russia. The company said that "our activities in Russia will focus on providing essential food, such as infant food and medical/hospital nutrition".

Personal life
Schneider is married to German lawyer, economist, and professor Anne van Aaken.

References

External links 
 Brief Biography on Reuters 
 Video interview on Wall Street Journal's website: Fresenius on Growth 

1965 births
American health care chief executives
Harvard Business School alumni
Living people
University of St. Gallen alumni
Directors of DuPont
German chief executives
Directors of Nestlé